Ngọc Sơn is a commune (xã) and village in Hiệp Hòa District, Bắc Giang Province, in northeastern Vietnam. It has a population of 9,412 according to the 2009 Census.

References

Populated places in Bắc Giang province
Communes of Bắc Giang province